The 2006 World Interuniversity Games were the eighth edition of the Games (organised by IFIUS), and were held in Dublin, Ireland, from October 9 to October 13, 2006.

Hosting
Dublin, Ireland, was selected as host city for the Games. The host university was the University College Dublin (UCD). Dublin City University (DCU) acted as a co-host.

Competitions
Teams participated in 6 different competitions (4 sports), this included the new addition of Volleyball Men & Women competitions.

 Football Men
 Football Women
 Futsal Men
 Basketball Men
 Volleyball Men
 Volleyball Women

Final standings

Football Men

Football Women

Futsal Men

Basketball Men

Volleyball Men

Volleyball Women

External links
 Results Dublin 2006

2006
2006 in multi-sport events
2006 in Irish sport
International sports competitions hosted by University College Dublin
Multi-sport events in Ireland
2000s in Dublin (city)
October 2006 sports events in Europe
Sport at Dublin City University